Sapps  is an unincorporated community in Pickens County, Alabama, United States.

History
A post office operated under the name Sapps from 1893 to 1905.

References

Unincorporated communities in Pickens County, Alabama
Unincorporated communities in Alabama